Xu Liqing (April 5, 1910 – January 6, 1983) birth name Xu Yingqing, was a lieutenant general in the People's Liberation Army. He was born in Shangcheng County, Henan Province (his birthplace is now part of Jinzhai County, Anhui Province). In August 1929 he joined the Chinese Workers' and Peasants' Red Army and the Communist Party of China that September. In the first Chinese Civil War, he was active in the border region of Hubei, Henan and Anhui. In 1940, he returned to Yan'an and placed in charge of the Shaanxi-Gansu-Ningxia region.

1910 births
1983 deaths
People's Liberation Army generals from Henan
People from Jinzhai County
People of the Republic of China
Eighth Route Army generals